George F. Clarke (August 28, 1911 – September 1985) was an American jazz tenor saxophonist.

Early life and education 
Clarke was born in Memphis, Tennessee. He attended Manassas High School, where he joined the Jimmie Lunceford Orchestra and played with the group until 1933.

Career 
After high school, Clarke then relocated to Buffalo, New York, playing there with Lil Hardin Armstrong and Stuff Smith in 1935. He worked with Smith again in 1939 and 1940 on tour and in the recording studio. Returning to Buffalo, Clarke led an ensemble at a local club from 1942 to 1954. Following this he moved to New York City, working with Wild Bill Davis and Jonah Jones, and touring internationally with Cootie Williams and Cozy Cole.

References 
Footnotes

General references
Howard Rye, "George Clarke". The New Grove Dictionary of Jazz. 2nd edition, ed. Barry Kernfeld.

American jazz saxophonists
American male saxophonists
Musicians from Memphis, Tennessee
1911 births
1985 deaths
20th-century American saxophonists
Jazz musicians from Tennessee
20th-century American male musicians
American male jazz musicians